Jheel Ke Us Paar (English: On the other side of the lake) is a 1973 Hindi film produced and directed by Bhappi Sonie. It is based on a novel by Gulshan Nanda, and stars Dharmendra, Mumtaz, Prem Chopra, Pran, Yogeeta Bali, Ranjeet and Shatrughan Sinha. The film's music is by R. D. Burman. Jal Mistry won the Filmfare Best Cinematographer Award

Cast
 Dharmendra as Sameer Rai
 Mumtaz as Neelu
 Yogeeta Bali as Jugnu
 Shatrughan Sinha as Dr. J. P. Tandon
 Prem Chopra as Pratap
 Ranjeet as Balraj
 Pran as Rasila
 Iftekhar as Diwanji
 Urmila Bhatt as Prabha 
 Faryal as Maya
 Anwar Hussain as Hariya
 Mehmood Junior as Chikku

Plot
Neelu (Mumtaz) is a blind girl in a village. Sameer Rai (Dharmendra), an artist, spots her and wants to give back her eyesight as she lost her eyesight in an accident when she got bumped of by his father in her childhood. Prem Chopra is complexly portrayed, he plays Pratap, step-brother of Sameer. Sameer's mother wants him to marry Jugnu (Yogeeta Bali) but he has fallen in love with the blind girl. Jugnu and Sameer's mother persuade Neelu to play blind even when she gets back her eyesight to dissuade Sameer to marry a down trodden village girl. They bring along a false husband of Neelu who carries her off into the clutches of Pratap the illegitimate half brother of Sameer. His love interest betrays him and he gets killed. His girlfriend and her dead husband who is actually alive and playing possum to get insurance money try to kill Neelu as she has witnessed  Pratap's murder. Everything gets resolved in the final climax based on a novel of the same name. The film has many twists and turns.

Soundtrack
All songs were written by Anand Bakshi.

References

External links 
 

1972 films
1970s Hindi-language films
Films scored by R. D. Burman
Films directed by Bhappi Sonie